The MegaCity Chorus is a Toronto, Ontario-based men's chorus of about 60 singers drawn from the Ontario District of the Barbershop Harmony Society.

History
Founded in 1997, the chorus has won the Ontario District Championship in 1999 and 2005 under their founding Director June Dale. They have competed at International Contest in 2003, 2005. The Chorus won the Ontario District Championship on October 17, 2011, and will be representing the Ontario District in the International Contest in Portland, Ore, in 2012.

Following International convention in July 2005 June Dale retired in order to concentrate on competitions with  North Metro Chorus. After June Dale's retirement, the musical direction of the chorus was taken over by Chris Arnold, former associate director of Toronto Northern Lights. The Megacity Chorus has been under the musical direction of Dan Rutzen since January 2011.

References

External links
MegaCity Chorus – Official website
Lyle's MegaWeb – Unofficial Site
Ontario District

Canadian choirs
Musical groups from Toronto
Barbershop Harmony Society choruses
A cappella musical groups
Musical groups established in 1997
1997 establishments in Ontario